Julio Perillán Gandarias (born September 8, 1973) is an American actor of Spanish descent.

Biography
Perillán was born and raised in Bethesda, Maryland, on the outskirts of Washington DC, the third of four children of two immigrants from Spain. Since he was born to Spaniards parents in Washington DC, Perillán holds dual citizenship of United States and Spain. He graduated with a degree in Physics from the University of Maryland, College Park.

After his father died in 1996 he moved to Los Angeles, California to study film and acting. In 1998 he started his career as an actor, appearing in plays such as Fool for Love (Madrid Theatre),  The Masque of Poe (Sacred Fools Theater Company), and Walk of Fame Café (Danville, Virginia).

Perillán's first film appearance was independent film Eden's Curve in 2003. After this, he moved to Spain to care for his paternal grandparents and look for work in the Spanish film industry.

His first job in Spain was a lead role in Fragile (2004), directed by Basque filmmaker Juanma Bajo Ulloa. He has subsequently appeared in films including The Dark Hour and Woody Allen's Vicky Cristina Barcelona.
His role as Max Linder in the documentary The Mystery of the King of Kinema got him nominated as best lead actor for the 2016 Goya film awards.

He has appeared on Spanish television in Los Ochenta and  El comisario on Telecinco, Hospital Central on Antena3, and Cuéntame cómo pasó (TVE).

He lives between Madrid, New York City and Los Angeles.

Filmography

Movies 
{| border="1" cellpadding="4" cellspacing="0"
|- bgcolor="#CCCCCC"
! Year || Title || Director
|-
| 2017 || Sister of Mine || 
|-
| 2014 ||The Mystery of the King of Kinema
 || Elio Quiroga
|-
| 2008 || NO-DO || Elio Quiroga
|-
| 2008 || Vicky Cristina Barcelona || Woody Allen
|-
| 2008 || ASD, Alma Sin Dueño || Tinieblas González
|-
| 2007 || K Il Bandito ||Martin Donovan
|-
| 2006 || The Dark Hour ||Elio Quiroga
|-
| 2006 || Moscow Zero ||María Lidón
|-
| 2004 || Malas temporadas ||Manuel Martín Cuenca
|-
| 2003 || Fragile ||Juanma Bajo Ulloa
|-
| 2002 || Eden's Curve ||Anne Misawa
|-
| 2001 || The Decay of Fiction ||Pat O'Neill
|-
|}

Shorts

Television
 Hospital Central: Serie de Antena3 2009
 Cuéntame cómo pasó: Serie de TVE 2003-2005
 El Comisario: Serie de Telecinco 2005
 Crusader, TV Movie  de Carlos Arribau 2004
 Los 80: Serie de Telecinco 2004

Theatre showsWalk of Fame Cafe,  producido por Stick Film Productions(2005)Fool for Love,  Madrid Theatre(2000)The Masque of Poe,  Sacred Fools Theater Company (1998)Beowulf and Grendel'',  Theatre West (1999)

References

External links
 
  Julio Perillán Página Web, sitio sobre Julio Perillán

University of Maryland, College Park alumni
1973 births
Living people
American people of Spanish descent
American male stage actors
Spanish male stage actors